Adelpha erotia, the Erotia sister, is a butterfly of the family Nymphalidae. It was described by William Chapman Hewitson in 1847.

Description
The wings of these butterflies have a brown ground colour with a characteristic blackish marbled pattern and a broad white band on the forewings. In the subapical area of the forewing there are large orange markings. The hindwings have a similar pattern, with a broad white median band.

Distribution and habitat
This species can be found from Mexico to Peru and Bolivia. The habitat consists of primary and disturbed rainforests at altitudes between 0 and 1,200 meters.

Subspecies
Adelpha erotia erotia (Nicaragua to Panama, Colombia, Ecuador, Peru, Bolivia, Guyana)
Adelpha erotia caphira (Hewitson, 1869) (Venezuela)

Bibliography
 A. Aiello Adelpha erotia erotia Form "Lerna" (Nymphalidae): Exploring a Corner of the Puzzle, Journal of the Lepidopterists' Society

References

Butterflies described in 1847
Adelpha
Nymphalidae of South America
Taxa named by William Chapman Hewitson